Resurrection Kings is the eponymous debut album of the international hard rock and metal supergroup Resurrection Kings featuring vocalist Chas West (ex-Bonham, ex-Tribe of Gypsies), guitar player Craig Goldy (Dio, ex-Giuffria), bass player Sean McNabb (Lynch Mob, ex-Dokken, ex-Quiet Riot, ex-Burning Rain) and drummer Vinny Appice (ex-Dio, ex-Black Sabbath, Heaven and Hell).

The album was released on January 29, 2016 and it was produced by Italian multi-instrumentalist Alessandro Del Vecchio (Hardline, Silent Force, ex-Voodoo Circle, Jorn, Edge of Forever, Sunstorm).

The first single “Who Did You Run To” was released on November 4, 2015.

Track listing

Personnel
 Chas West – lead vocals
 Craig Goldy – guitar, arrangement 
 Sean McNabb – bass guitar
 Vinny Appice – drums

Additional personnel
 Alessandro Del Vecchio – keyboards, backing vocals, arrangement, production, mixing, mastering
 Serafino Perugino – executive producer

References

2016 debut albums
Frontiers Records albums